Charles Jenkinson, 1st Earl of Liverpool, PC (26 April 172917 December 1808), known as Lord Hawkesbury between 1786 and 1796, was a British statesman. He was the father of Prime Minister Robert Jenkinson, 2nd Earl of Liverpool.

Early years, family and education
He was born in Oxfordshire, the eldest son of Colonel Charles Jenkinson (1693–1750) and Amarantha (daughter of Wolfran Cornewall). The earl was the grandson of Sir Robert Jenkinson, 2nd Baronet, of Walcot, Oxfordshire. The Jenkinson family was descended from Anthony Jenkinson (died 1611), who was a sea-captain, merchant, and traveller and the first known Englishman to penetrate into Central Asia. Liverpool was educated at Charterhouse School and University College, Oxford, where he graduated Master of Arts in 1752.

Political career
In 1761, Liverpool entered parliament as member for Cockermouth and was made Under-Secretary of State by Lord Bute. He won the favour of George III, and when Bute retired Jenkinson became the leader of the "King's Friends" in the House of Commons. In 1763, George Grenville appointed him joint Secretary to the Treasury.

In 1766,after a short retirement, he became a Lord of the Admiralty and then a Lord of the Treasury in the Grafton administration. In 1772, Jenkinson became a Privy Councillor and Vice Treasurer of Ireland, and in 1775 he purchased the lucrative sinecure of Clerk of the Pells in Ireland and became Master of the Mint of Ireland.

From 1778 until the close of Lord North's ministry in 1782 he was Secretary at War. From 1786 to 1804, he was President of the Board of Trade and Chancellor of the Duchy of Lancaster, and he was popularly regarded as enjoying the confidence of the king to a special degree.

In 1786 he was created Baron Hawkesbury, of Hawkesbury in the County of Gloucester, and ten years later, Earl of Liverpool. He also succeeded his cousin in 1790 as the 7th Baronet of Walcot and to the family estates. He lived at Addiscombe Place, Surrey and in Hawkesbury, Gloucestershire. He died in London on 17 December 1808.

Family
Liverpool was twice married. In 1769 he married first Amelia, daughter of William Watts, governor of Fort William, Bengal, and of his wife, better known as Begum Johnson. Amelia died in July 1770, a month after the birth of her only child, Robert.

Liverpool married secondly Catherine, daughter of Sir Cecil Bishopp, 6th Baronet, and widow of Sir Charles Cope, 2nd Baronet, on 22 June 1782 at her house in Hertford Street, London. They had one son, Charles, who became 3rd Earl of Liverpool, and one daughter, Charlotte, who married James Grimston, 1st Earl of Verulam.

On Lord Liverpool's death, he was succeeded by his son from his first marriage, Robert, who became a prominent politician and eventually Prime Minister of the United Kingdom. The Countess of Liverpool died in October 1827, aged 82.

Legacy
Liverpool wrote several political works, but according to the Encyclopædia Britannica Eleventh Edition, other than for his Treatise on the Coins of the Realm (1805) these are "without striking merits".

The Hawkesbury River in New South Wales, Australia and Hawkesbury, Ontario, Canada were named after Jenkinson shortly after he was created Baron Hawkesbury.

At least two ships were named after Jenkinson under his title of Lord Hawkesbury: one launched in America in 1781—presumably under another name—but entered in Lloyd's Register from 1787 as the Lord Hawkesbury, sailing as a whaler; and the East Indiaman Lord Hawkesbury, launched in 1787.

Notes

References

 

Attribution:

Further reading

1727 births
1808 deaths
18th-century English people
19th-century English people
Alumni of University College, Oxford
British and English royal favourites
Chancellors of the Duchy of Lancaster
Jenkinson, Charles
1st Earl of Liverpool
Jenkinson, Charles
Members of the Privy Council of Great Britain
People educated at Charterhouse School
People from Oxfordshire
Jenkinson, Charles
Jenkinson, Charles
Jenkinson, Charles
Jenkinson, Charles
Jenkinson, Charles
Jenkinson, Charles
Parents of prime ministers of the United Kingdom
Presidents of the Board of Trade
Peers of Great Britain created by George III
Lords of the Admiralty